Arthur Henrique Bittencourt (born 28 January 1997), known as Arthur Henrique, is a Brazilian professional footballer who plays as a goalkeeper for Mirassol.

References

External links

1997 births
Living people
Brazilian footballers
Association football goalkeepers
Coritiba Foot Ball Club players
Campeonato Brasileiro Série A players
Campeonato Brasileiro Série D players
Foz do Iguaçu Futebol Clube players
Clube de Regatas Brasil players